German submarine U-436 was a Type VIIC U-boat of Nazi Germany's Kriegsmarine during World War II.

She carried out eight patrols.

She sank seven ships, total  and 291 tons; Two ships were damaged, totalling 15,575 GRT.

She was a member of ten wolfpacks.

She was sunk by Allied warships in mid-Atlantic on 26 May 1943.

Design
German Type VIIC submarines were preceded by the shorter Type VIIB submarines. U-436 had a displacement of  when at the surface and  while submerged. She had two shafts and two  propellers.

U-436 was fitted with five  torpedo tubes (four fitted at the bow and one at the stern), fourteen torpedoes, one  SK C/35 naval gun, 220 rounds, and a  C/30 anti-aircraft gun. The boat had a complement of between forty-four and sixty.

Service history
The submarine was laid down on 25 April 1940 at Schichau-Werke in Danzig (now Gdansk, Poland) as yard number 1478, launched on 21 June 1941 and commissioned on 27 September 1941 under the command of Kapitänleutnant Günther Seibicke.

She served with the 5th U-boat Flotilla from 27 September 1941 for training and the 7th flotilla from 1 February 1942 for operations. She was reassigned, first to the 11th flotilla on 1 July, then the 6th flotilla on 1 September.

First patrol
U-436s first patrol was from Kiel in Germany and took in the Norwegian and Barents Seas. She docked at Kirkenes, not far from the border between Norway and the Soviet Union on 17 February 1942.

Second and third patrols
The boat's initial success came when she sank the Soviet trawler RT-19 Komitern on 1 March 1942 east of Murmansk.

The submarine's third sortie commenced with her departure from Kirkenes on 7 April 1942. On the 13th, she sank the Soviet Kiev north of the North Cape. The vessel went down in seven minutes.

Fourth and fifth patrols
U-436 carried out her fourth and fifth patrols from Kirkenes and Trondheim. They were followed by a series of journeys which were not recognized as patrols. At their end, she was back in Kiel.

Sixth patrol
The U-boat left Kiel once more on 6 October 1942, but this time she was headed for the Atlantic Ocean, via the gap separating the Faroe and Shetland Islands.

On the 27th, she torpedoed, but did not sink, the Norwegian Frontenac in mid-Atlantic. The ship's bow section was badly damaged, so much so that her propeller was raised out of the water. The accompanying fire was extinguished by a large wave; the ship was pumped out and she was capable of moving under her own power. During the same attack, she sank the Sourabaya. Also lost was the landing craft HMS LCT-2281 which had been carried on deck. Two days later, the boat sank the Barrwhinn.

She arrived at Lorient in occupied France on 12 November.

Seventh patrol
Patrol number seven saw U-436 sink the Albert L. Ellsworth south of the Azores on 8 January 1943. The ship had been abandoned after being hit by a torpedo but remained afloat. The wreck was sunk by gunfire from the U-boat the following evening.

Eighth patrol and loss
By now based at St. Nazaire, she left the French port on 25 April 1943. On 26 May 1943 she was attacked and sunk west of Cape Ortegal in northwest Spain by depth charges from the frigate  and the corvette .

Forty-seven men went down with U-436; there were no survivors.

Wolfpacks
U-436 took part in ten wolfpacks, namely:
 Umbau (7 – 16 February 1942)
 Umhang (10 – 16 March 1942)
 Robbenschlag (7 – 14 April 1942)
 Blutrausch (15 – 19 April 1942)
 Strauchritter (29 April – 1 May 1942)
 Greif (14 – 26 May 1942)
 Puma (16 – 29 October 1942)
 Natter (30 October – 6 November 1942)
 Delphin (26 December 1942 – 12 February 1943)
 Drossel (29 April – 15 May 1943)

Summary of raiding history

References

Notes

Citations

Bibliography

External links

German Type VIIC submarines
U-boats commissioned in 1941
U-boats sunk in 1943
U-boats sunk by depth charges
U-boats sunk by British warships
1941 ships
Ships built in Danzig
Ships lost with all hands
World War II submarines of Germany
World War II shipwrecks in the Atlantic Ocean
Maritime incidents in May 1943
Ships built by Schichau